The  is a privately owned ferry service crossing the Tsugaru Strait, which separates Hokkaido from Honshu. The ferries run two routes: Hakodate to Aomori and Hakodate to Ōma.

Routes

Hakodate—Aomori
This route links the Port of Hakodate in Hakodate, Hokkaido with the Port of Aomori in Aomori. 8 round trips are made per day, with each trip taking three hours and forty minutes one way. The route is operated by four ships: the Blue Mermaid, Blue Dolphin, Blue Happiness, and Blue Luminous. Each ship makes two round trips a day. With the conversion of the Seikan Tunnel from convention trains into the Hokkaido Shinkansen, this route has seen a resurgence in ridership as the cheaper alternative. It connects Japan National Route 4 in Aomori with Japan National Route 5 in Hakodate.

Hakodate—Ōma
This route links Hakodate with the Port of Ōma in Ōma, Aomori. National Routes 279 and 338 run along this route as well.

History
Aside from the current routes, the Higashi Nihon Ferry also operated a wide network connecting Muroran, Tomakomai, and Iwanai to the north; Sendai, Hachinohe, Ōarai, and Jōetsu to the south; and Busan, South Korea. However, these lines proved to be less and less profitable and closed one after another.

In October 2000 , Dōnan Jidōsha Ferry began operating passenger services with a newly built ship, the Esan 2000. In November 2008, Higashi Nihon Ferry suspended its Hakodate—Aomori, Hakodate—Ōma, and Muroran—Aomori services and sold three ships (Venus, Virgo, and Vayu) to Dōnan Jidōsha Ferry. Dōnan Jidōsha Ferry, however, chose not to operate the Muroran—Aomori route. On November 1, 2009, Higashi Nihon Ferry was merged into Dōnan Jidōsha Ferry, and the resulting company was renamed as Tsugaru Kaikyō Ferry.

Fleet

References

Ferry companies of Japan
Transport in Hokkaido
Transport in Aomori Prefecture
1972 establishments in Japan